Zagar Pyaw Thaw Athel Hnalone is a 1968 Burmese black-and-white drama film directed by Thukha. The film won three Myanmar Academy Awards including Best Film, Best Director and Best Supporting Actor.

Cast
Soe Naing as Myo Khine
Tin Tin Nwe as Tin Tin Maw
Kyi Kyi Htay as Mi Mi Khine, Thel Au
Myo Nyein as U Kyaw Khine
Thein Maung as U Thein Zan
Kyuk Lone as Ba Kunt
Thida Khin Htwe as Daw Ma Ma
Ba Chit as Ba Chit
Thukha as U Thukha

Awards

References

1968 films
1968 drama films
Burmese black-and-white films
Burmese drama films
1960s Burmese-language films